Noam Braslavsky (born 1961) is an Israeli artist and curator who lives and works in Berlin.

Biography
Noam Brasklavsky was born in Poria Illit, Israel. In the early 1980s, Braslavsky studied at the Bezalel Academy of Art and Design in Jerusalem, subsequently studying Film at the Beit Zvi acting school in Ramat Gan and completing his Master of Fine Arts at the Multimedia Department of the Düsseldorf Art Academy with Nam June Paik/Nan Hoover.

Art career
In the 1980s and 1990s he created manipulative, interactive room installations, which he displayed in dark or black rooms (he speaks of “black cubes" in contrast to the usual white cubes). "Shelter" (concrete, steel, glass, Plexiglas and sea-shells) was set on fire in an act of sabotage years later at his solo exhibition "Magic as Existential Need" in Tel Aviv; only the steel frame and the concrete pedestals survived.

Braslavsky’s works are traps that take their cues from sacred architecture, nature and society. He analyzes manipulative mechanisms that influence and control the human psyche, translating them in simplified form into rooms. Some examples are artificial wombs, purring machines, compulsive hats, labyrinths and enormous cocoons.

One of his early works (1984) explores the abolition of space and the dissolution of its boundaries, and can also be seen as a sort of virtual (miniature) stage for his subsequent creative work. "Blue" is a second head, a perceptual fuelling station that supplies nothing but pure blue light, suspending the perception of space for a time while promoting pure vision.

On 21 October 2010, Braslavsky unveiled a life-sized sculpture of former Prime Minister of Israel, Ariel Sharon, who was in a persistent vegetative state after suffering a stroke in 2006, in a hospital bed with an IV drip at the Kishon Gallery in Tel Aviv. Knesset member Yoel Hasson described the work as “sickening voyeurism”, and Ronit Tirosh declared in the Knesset: “This is not art!” Menachem Wecker of the Houston Chronicle  wrote: “But it will be interesting to see how viewers respond to the work. Will it be perceived as a piñata or a voodoo doll, or will it create a safe (aesthetic) space where viewers can transcend clichéd, extremist political discourse and use art as a medium to consider the man himself as he lies on what is almost certainly his death bed?”

In 2003 Braslavsky founded GdK (Galerie der Künste) in Berlin, shortly thereafter establishing the eponymous art association together with his wife Emma Braslavsky.

Selected exhibitions
 2014 The "shores of bikini" at "Above the Roofs of Berlin" Berlin. 
 2013 "Reflection" at "ArTicks" Beningston Gallery The Israel Museum, Jerusalem.
 2013 2013 "reconciliation" at "The Spaces Below. The Spaces Above", exhibition in open space, Beit Hagefen, Haifa/Israel
 2012 "Unattainable", MANIFESTA, Belgium
 2012 "Middle-East Europe", DOX Museum, Prague
 2010 "Ariel Sharon", Kishon Gallery, Tel Aviv/Israel
 2010 "Mediators", The National Museum, Warsaw/Poland
 2009 "n.b.l.", NCCA, Moscow/Russia
 2008 "European Attitude", Zendai Museum of Modern Art, Shanghai/China
 2008 “The Murakami Collection”, Faust Kunsthalle, Hanover/Deutschland (solo show)
 2008 "Strictly Berlin - "Between Fiction and Fact", Berlin/Germany
 2007 "Asia-Europe Mediations", New Synagogue, Poznan/Poland
 2007 "Strictly Berlin - "Targets of Opportunity", Berlin/Germany
 2007 "Pathos", Galerie Dieter Reitz, Kassel
 2007 “The Artist as Readymade”, Berlin
 2006 "Strictly Berlin 2000-2006", Berlin/Germany
 2004 "zivilgeneratur", Berlin/Germany
 2004 Artiade Exhibition Hall, Athens/Greece
 2003 Central Exhibition Hall, St. Petersburg/Russia
 2003 "Zufluchträume I-III" in the Tiergarten park, Berlin/Germany (solo show)
 2002 "The Boundaries of Sculpture", Open Museum, Tefen-Beer Sheva/Israel
 2000 "Festival of Vision", Hong Kong/China
 1998 "Magic as Existential Need", Hamumche Art Space, Tel Aviv/Israel (solo show)
 1996 "The Freedom to Choose", aktions galerie, Berlin/Germany (solo show)
 1995 "The Treasure of the Baltic Sea", MS Stubnitz, Rostock/Germany (solo show)
 1993 "Creator of the Worlds", Laznia Art Space, Gdansk/Poland (solo show)
 1992 "Shelter", Produzentengalerie Düsseldorf/Deutschland (solo show)
 1989 "Enlightened Darkness", Zman Amiti - Alternative Art Space, Tel Aviv/Israel (solo show)

See also
Israeli art

References

External links
 USA Today about Braslavskys installation "Ariel Sharon"
 The Telegraph about Braslavskys installation "Ariel Sharon"
 BBC about Braslavskys installation "Ariel Sharon"
 The Independent about Braslavskys installation "Ariel Sharon"
 Braslavsky at NCCA
 Braslavsky in the "Random selection of Israeli video art
 Braslavsky at artfacts.net
 Website of the artist
 Art association GdK e.V.

Living people
1961 births
Israeli contemporary artists